Euthanizer is a 2017 Finnish thriller film directed by Teemu Nikki. It was screened in the Contemporary World Cinema section at the 2017 Toronto International Film Festival. It was selected as the Finnish entry for the Best Foreign Language Film at the 91st Academy Awards, but it was not nominated.

Cast
 Matti Onnismaa
 Alina Tomnikov
 Jari Virman
 Heikki Nousiainen
 Ilari Johansson

See also
 List of submissions to the 91st Academy Awards for Best Foreign Language Film
 List of Finnish submissions for the Academy Award for Best Foreign Language Film

References

External links
 

2017 films
2017 thriller films
2010s Finnish-language films
Finnish thriller films